Leszek Jan Sibilski (born April 1, 1958) is a Polish-American sociologist, track cyclist, and originator of the World Bicycle Day.

Education and professional career 
Leszek Sibilski graduated from Education and Sport Science at the Academy of Physical Education in Poznań. In 2000, he earned Ph.D. in Sociology in Social Inclusion and Social Movements from the Jagiellonian University in Kraków, Poland. As a sociologist, he focuses on climate change, the environment, family, public policy, global poverty, youth, and role of women in contemporary society.

In 1980s, Sibilski worked for Przegląd Sportowy daily and Sportowiec weekly as a reporter and photographer, carrying out interviews, among others, with Lech Wałęsa and Eddy Merckx. He has been also a physical education teacher at schools in Witaszyce and Jarocin. In 1987, Sibilski decided to move from Poland, when during business trip to the United States, he was offered post at the Achilles Track Club, New York City. Between 1989 and 1993, he served as the Director for International Affairs there. He has been also working for the World Bank, and the United Nations. Later, he became professor at the Catholic University of America, Montgomery College, and Marymount University.

Cyclist 
From 1971 to 1983, he trained in track cycling. He was national junior champion in sprint as well as on the 500 and 1000 metres distances. He was member of a national team. In 1976, Sibilski was chosen Cyclist of the Year by the Polish Olympic Committee. Though he did not continue his professional career as a senior, he remained active in promoting sport. He became engaged especially in improving the status of athletes with disabilities in developing countries and minority participation in sport. He took part in the 2010 Winter Paralympics torch relay. In 2015, publishing an article titled "Cycling is Everyone's Business", Sibilski started a grassroots campaign to establish a World Bicycle Day. He received the formal support of the Turkmenistan Representation to the United Nations. On April 12, 2018, the resolution establishing June 3 as World Bicycle Day was supported by 193 countries of which 56 were co-sponsors. On 15 March 2022, following similar campaign by Sibilski, UN General Assembly adopted a resolution on integration of mainstream bicycling into public transportation systems for sustainable development.

Sibilski is also engaged in commemoration of the 1978 air crash near Gabare, Bulgaria in which five Polish cyclists died. He was not a member of the team thanks to his commitments at the university.

Sibilski received several awards, e.g. from the Mayors of New York City, Boston, the China Disabled Persons' Federation, president Bill Clinton, Inspiring Jewish Journeys Award for Education (2012), Leo Foley Award for Outstanding Educator at the Catholic University of America (2007), the Trailblazer Award by the World Bicycle Relief. He was a Kosciuszko Foundation and Harvard Kennedy School scholar.

Private life 
Sibilski grew up in Jarocin, Poland. He is married to Krystyna and is father to Jakub and Agnieszka. He lives in Washington, D.C. He holds both Polish and American citizenships.

References 

1958 births
American sociologists
American sports executives and administrators
Catholic University of America School of Arts and Sciences faculty
Marymount University faculty
Montgomery College faculty
People from Jaworzno
Polish emigrants to the United States
Polish schoolteachers
Polish sociologists
Polish sports journalists
Polish track cyclists
Living people